Equine multinodular pulmonary fibrosis is a chronic lung disease of horses. There is evidence that the disease is caused by infection with a gammaherpesvirus, equine herpesvirus 5. The disease affects usually adult horses reducing the ability to exercise as a result of the formation of nodular lesions in the lungs.

Signs and symptoms 
Signs of equine multinodular pulmonary fibrosis are mainly weight loss, fever, respiratory distress and depression.  Unwillingness to move, mild cough and intermittent tachypnea have been reported. When the disease progresses, the general condition of the horse usually deteriorates, showing possible signs as severe dyspnea, hypoxemia or nasal discharge.

Diagnosis 
Generally EMPF has been categorized as an uncommon disease in horses with idiopathic in origin. Comparing to other interstitial fibrosing lung diseases in horses, the lesions in EMPF differ remarkably due to their nodular pattern. In histologic examinations, a sharp border may be discerned between the fibrotic and intact lung tissue. Integrative fact among horses with EMPF has been frequently established to be an infection of EHV-5. Diagnosis is based on the PCR results and pathomorphological findings from lungs. The disease has been reported as part of the granumalomatous process in an apparent silicate pneumoconiosis.  Among horses with diagnosed EMPF, thoracic radiography have shown several changes. Generalized mixed interstitial and nodular pattern in the lung parenchyma,  large radiodense opacity in the caudodorsal area of the lung  and thickened peribronchial walls. Thoracic ultrasonography have demonstrated a bilaterally generalized pleural roughening, several comet tails and multiple, hyperechogenic scattered areas.

Pathology findings 
Based on a study of 5 horses by T. POTH, G. NIEDERMAIER and W. HERMANNS (2009) as well as on a study of 24 horses investigated by WILLIAMS et al. (2007), there are significant pathomorphological findings in lungs with equine multinodular pulmonary fibrosis. In gross findings can be noticed pulmonary induration in all lung lobes as well as lesions restricted to the lungs and the bronchiolar lymph nodes. The distribution between two patterns can be seen as a large, whitish until tan and firm nodules of fibrosis. There are noticed histological findings, such as fibrosis and inflammation in different stages and degrees. In alveolies accumulation of neutrophils can be identified, and enlarged, vacuolated macrophages with several multinucleated giant cells. In addition hypertrophy of type II pneumocytes, formation on abnormal cystic airspaces and viral eosinophilic intranuclear inclusion bodies in intraluminal macrophages.

Treatment and prognosis 
Different treatments have been experimented with horses diagnosed EMPF, but the prognosis of EMPF is tentative to unfavourable.

References

External links 

Horse diseases